Phaeospora is a genus of fungi in the class Dothideomycetes; its familial placement is uncertain.

Species
Phaeospora arctica 
Phaeospora australiensis 
Phaeospora everniae 
Phaeospora exoriens 
Phaeospora lemaneae 
Phaeospora perrugosaria 
Phaeospora protoblasteniae 
Phaeospora rimosicola 
Phaeospora squamarinae 
Phaeospora subantarctica 
Phaeospora triphractoides 
Phaeospora verrucariae

References

Verrucariales
Lichen genera
Taxa described in 1879